The 1977 Arkansas State Indians football team represented Arkansas State University as a member of the Southland Conference during the 1977 NCAA Division I football season. Led by seventh-year head coach Bill Davidson, the Indians compiled an overall record of 7–4 with a mark of 2–3 in conference, placing fourth in the Southland.

Schedule

References

Arkansas State
Arkansas State Red Wolves football seasons
Arkansas State Indians football